Tanish  is an Indian actor and television personality known for his lead roles in Telugu films. He has starred in films such as Nachavule, Ride, Telugabbai, Pandavulu Pandavulu Thummeda, and Nakshatram. He has also kickstarted a television career, as he was one of the contestants on the reality TV show Bigg Boss Telugu 2, which was hosted by noted Telugu star Nani. Tanish finished in 3rd place in Bigg Boss Telugu 2.

Early life and family
Tanish was born to Alladi Yesuvardhan Babu and Saraswati. He has 2 younger brothers named Alladi Vamsi Krishna and Alladi Kushwanth.

Career
In 2008 and 2009 he appeared in two successful films Nachavule and Ride. In 2012 he appeared in Mem Vayasuku Vacham with Niti Taylor. In the same year, another movie Chanakyudu with Ishita Dutta under the direction of Gotteganti Srinivas, was released.

In 2013 he worked with director Avinash O Sridhar for Telugabbai. Co-starring Ramya Nambeesan, the film did not do well at the box office. After many solo failures at the box office, Tanish also starred in two big multistarrers. The first was the moderately successful Pandavulu Pandavulu Thummeda (2014), in which he starred alongside Mohan Babu, Vishnu Manchu, Manoj Manchu, Varun Sandesh, Hansika Motwani, and Pranitha Subhash. In 2017, he starred in another ensemble film directed by Krishna Vamsi, Nakshatram, in which he starred alongside Sundeep Kishan and Sai Dharam Tej.

Controversy
In February 2019, Kaushal blamed Tanish over his lost chance to get a movie offer for which his fan was supposed to be the producer. Tanish denied these allegations and stated he would proceed with legal notices against Kaushal.

In 2017, Tanish was called for investigation in a drugs case in Nampally.

Filmography

Television

References

External links
 

Indian male film actors
Living people
Male actors in Telugu cinema
21st-century Indian male actors
Telugu people
Indian male child actors
20th-century Indian male actors
People from Eluru
Male actors from Andhra Pradesh
Year of birth missing (living people)
Bigg Boss (Telugu TV series) contestants